This is a list of royal commissions and commissions of inquiry appointed by the Government of South Australia. Royal Commissions are currently held in South Australia under the terms of the Royal Commissions Act 1917. This list includes Royal Commissions that were conducted jointly with the Government of Australia. Note that this list excludes Select Committees.

Other inquiries

See also
 List of Australian royal commissions

References

Royal commissions
South Australian